Salaberry—Suroît is a federal electoral district in Quebec. It encompasses a portion of Quebec formerly included in the electoral districts of Beauharnois—Salaberry (76%) and Vaudreuil-Soulanges (24%).

Salaberry—Suroît was created by the 2012 federal electoral boundaries redistribution and was legally defined in the 2013 representation order. It came into effect upon the call of the 42nd Canadian federal election, scheduled for 19 October 2015.

Profile
The Bloc dominates the north of the riding, in areas such as Beauharnois, Salaberry-de-Vallefield and Les Coteaux. To the south, the Liberals perform better in rural, more Anglophone communities such as Huntingdon and Ormstown. These distinctions were true even as the NDP held the riding in 2015.

Members of Parliament
This riding has elected the following Members of Parliament:

Election results

References

Quebec federal electoral districts
Salaberry-de-Valleyfield
Vaudreuil-Soulanges Regional County Municipality
Le Haut-Saint-Laurent Regional County Municipality
Beauharnois-Salaberry Regional County Municipality